This page contains past rosters  of the Galatasaray S.K. (wheelchair basketball) team.

2000 Era

2005-06
Roster

2006-07
Roster

2007-08
Roster

2008-09
Roster

2009-10
Roster

2010 Era

2010-11
Roster

2011-12
Roster

2012-13
Roster

2013-14
Roster

2014-15
Roster

2015-16
Roster

2016-17
Roster

2017-18
Roster

2018-19
Roster

2019-20
Roster

2020 Era

2020–21
Roster

2021–22
Roster

2022–23
Roster

Galatasaray S.K. (wheelchair basketball)